Chupke Se, is a 2003 Bollywood Romantic comedy film, directed by Shona Urvashi. It stars Zulfi Syed, Masumeh Makhija, Rati Agnihotri, Tinnu Anand, Om Puri, Reema Lagoo and Dilip Prabhawalkar. The film's soundtrack was composed by Vishal Bhardwaj, while the lyrics were penned by Gulzar.

Plot 

Megha Timghure (Masumeh Makhija) is a plain-looking middle-class girl, living  with her Mum, Laxmi (Reema Lagoo), and Dad (Dilip Prabhawalkar), who is employed as an Income Tax Officer. Her desire is to become a model and a beauty queen. At a party, she is wrongly introduced as Sarika Verma, and meets two eligible young men, Rizwan, and Varun Arya (Zulfi Syed). She expresses her wish to become a model and is referred to Almera Kochar (Rati Agnihotri), who has a reputation of bringing out the best in every model, and making them beauty queens. Almera meets with Sarika / Megha, and accepts her as a student, and makes her sign a contract. What Sarika does not know that she has now become a pawn in a devious plot concocted to protect millions gained by criminal activities on the black market.

Cast 

 Zulfi Syed as Varun Arya
 Masumeh Makhija as Megha Timghure/Sarika Mehra
 Om Puri as Qasim Khan Qayamat
 Rati Agnihotri as Almera Kochar
 Tinnu Anand as Tiny Kochar
 Dilip Prabhawalkar as Babanrao Timghure (Megha's father)
 Reema Lagoo as Laxmi (Megha's mother)
 Jayant Kripalani as Anand Arya (Varun's father)
 Raj Zutshi as Sunel
 Peeya Rai Chowdhary as Sheetal (Megha's friend)
 Raman Lamba as Rizwan
 Kurush Deboo as Shop Manager

Soundtrack 

The soundtrack of Chupke Se consists of 6 songs composed by Vishal Bhardwaj, the lyrics of which were written by Gulzar and Abbas Tyrewala.

Critical reception 

Taran Adarsh of Bollywood Hungama gave the film a rating of 1.5 out of 5 saying that, "Director Shona Urvashi gets the technique of film-making right, but is let down by the writing [Abbas Tyrewala, Shona herself]. The script fluctuates from plausible to implausible with regularity and that’s where it falters." Ron Ahluwalia of Planet Bollywood gave the film a rating of 6 out of 10 saying that, "Chupke Se... is an attempt at an entertaining venture that just doesn't cut it. Ridden by cliches, incongruities, unnecessary use of derogatory language, below average direction and a supersaturated plot, this movie can simply be judged as amateur." Namrata Joshi of Outlook gave the film a rating of 2 out of 5 saying that, "Chupke Se is an earnest first attempt which could have been so much more fun. The gags and pranks don't really sparkle."

References 

2003 films
2003 romantic comedy films
Indian romantic comedy films
2000s Hindi-language films
Films scored by Vishal Bhardwaj
Films scored by Ranjit Barot